Golborne Bellow is a former civil parish, now in the parish of Tattenhall and District, in the Cheshire West and Chester district, and ceremonial county of Cheshire in England. In 2001 it had a population of 89. The parish included part of the village of Gatesheath. The civil parish was abolished in 2015 to form Tattenhall and District.

See also

Listed buildings in Golborne Bellow

References

External links

Former civil parishes in Cheshire
Cheshire West and Chester